Frida Hyvönen Gives You: Music from the Dance Performance PUDEL is the second album released by Swedish Singer-songwriter Frida Hyvönen.

About the album Hyvönen wrote:

Track listing
 "Intro" – 0:38
 "Fall Is My Lover" – 3:14
 "See How I Came Into Town" – 3:33
 "Paus Piano" – 1:12
 "New Messiah" – 2:12
 "Came a Storm" – 2:46
 "Cricket" – 1:55
 "Oh! Oh!" – 2:59
 "This Night I Recall You" – 5:04
 "Outro" – 0:22

All songs written by Frida Hyvönen

Personnel
Frida Hyvönen: piano, vocals
Bebe Risenfors: trumpet, double bass, clarinet, tuba, accordion, choir
Jon Bergström: viola da gamba, choir
Jonas Hagberth: choir
The Amanda Quartet:
Åsa Håkansson – violin, choir
Anna Rosén – violin, choir
Markus Falkbring – viola, choir
Mattias Rodrick – cello, choir
Jon Bergström: Production, string arrangements, mixing
Jonas Hagberth: Engineering
Ulla Lannér: Catering
Joachim Ekermann: Mixing
Håkan Åkesson: Mastering
Lisa Millberg: Cover design
Liselotte Watkins: Illustration

2007 albums
Frida Hyvönen albums
Licking Fingers albums